The Hainberg (known locally as the Hainberge as it has several summits. Also the old form Heinberg) is a hill range, up to 299 metres high, northwest of the Harz Mountains in the eastern part of Lower Saxony, Germany.

Geography 
The heavily wooded Hainberg runs along the boundary of the counties of Wolfenbüttel, Goslar and Hildesheim. It is located in the centre of the im Zentrum des Innerste Uplands, a northeastern section of the Lower Saxon Hills, several kilometres southwest of the town of Salzgitter and borders on the Ambergau to the east. The ridge is west of the River Innerste, northwest of the Neile and east of the Nette between the ridges of Vorholz to the north-northwest and the Salzgitter Ridge (including the Lichtenbergen) to the north, northeast and east. South of the Hainberg are the northwestern fringes of the Harz Mountains. The Hainberg runs from Holle in the north-northwest and Baddeckenstedt to the north Norden and east to Lutter am Barenberge in the south. To the west of the Hainberg lies Bockenem in the middle of the Ambergau.

A section of the A 7 motorway runs in a north-south direction through the northwestern part of the Hainberg and part of the B 6 federal road runs past to the northeast. To the southeast the B 248 grazes the hills.

Description 
The Hainberg is up to 299 metres high at the Kalter Buschkopf. Several tributary streams of the Innerste and Nette rise on its slopes and it is crossed by several hiking trails and forest tracks.

Among the sights of the Hainberg are the Bodensteiner Klippen (ca. 200 to ), which are made of sandstone and run for about 3 km through the southern part of the Hainberg. To the north of those crags is St. Hubert's Grotto. There is a viewing tower, the Jägerturm ("Hunter's Tower") on the Northern Jägertumskopf (244 m), from which there are views of the Harz to the south. Also worth visiting is Wohldenberg Castle, which stands on the Wohldenberg (218 m) in the northwest of the hills. There are good views from the bergfried.

Hills 
Amongst the hills in the Hainberg are the following:

 Kalter Buschkopf
 Schlahköpfe (285 m)
 Steinberg (283 m; part of the Bodensteiner Klippen)
 Hohlenberg (263 m)
 Bodensteiner Klippen (ca. 200 to 283 m)
 Kliebenkopf (254 m)
 Lauhberg (253 m)
 Jägerturmsköpfe (251 m)
 Northern (Nördlicher) Jägertumskopf (244 m) - with Jägerturm
 Osterklippe (235 m; part of the Bodensteiner Klippen)
 Eichenberg (226 m)
 Papenberg (226 m)
 Hillenberg (224 m)
 Langenberg (224 m)
 Spitzer Hai (222 m)
 Wohldenberg (218 m) - with Wohldenberg Castle
 Kapitelhai (209 m)
 Hützlah (206 m)

Settlements 
Settlements in and near the Hainberg are:

 Baddeckenstedt to the north-northeast
 Bockenem to the west
 Sehlde to the east
 Holle to the north-northwest
 Wallmoden to the south
 Heere to the northeast

References 

Forests and woodlands of Lower Saxony
Hill ranges of Lower Saxony
Natural regions of the Weser-Leine Uplands